Hodejovec is a village and municipality in the Rimavská Sobota District of the Banská Bystrica Region of southern Slovakia.

History
In historical records, the village was first mentioned in 1246 (Gede). It belonged to Hunt-Poznany, in the 15th century to Kaplaiy and Plóczi, and in the 16th century to Hajnáčka. From 1938 to 1945 it was annexed by Hungary.

Genealogical resources
The records for genealogical research are available at the state archive "Statny Archiv in Banska Bystrica, Slovakia"

 Roman Catholic church records (births/marriages/deaths): 1762-1897 (parish B)

See also
 List of municipalities and towns in Slovakia

External links
https://web.archive.org/web/20080111223415/http://www.statistics.sk/mosmis/eng/run.html
http://www.hodejovec.ou.sk/
http://www.hodejovec.gemer.org/
http://www.e-obce.sk/obec/hodejovec/hodejovec.html
Surnames of living people in Hodejovec

Villages and municipalities in Rimavská Sobota District